Denis Nulty KC*HS (born 7 June 1963) is an Irish Roman Catholic prelate who has served as Bishop of Kildare and Leighlin since 2013.

Early life
Nulty was born in Slane, County Meath, on 7 June 1963, the youngest of five children to Den Nulty and his wife Nan (née Balfe).

He attended primary school at St. Patrick's National School, Slane, and secondary school at St Patrick's Classical School, Navan, before studying for the priesthood at St Patrick's College, Maynooth, in 1981, obtaining a Bachelor of Arts in 1984 and a Bachelor of Divinity in 1987.

He was ordained to the priesthood for the Diocese of Meath on 12 June 1988.

Presbyteral ministry 
Following his ordination, Nulty served for ten years as a curate in the cathedral parish of Mullingar, as well as chaplain to the local Accord centre and spiritual director at St Finian's College. He became the youngest parish priest in Ireland when he was appointed to St Mary’s parish, Drogheda, in August 1998.

Nulty completed further studies in All Hallows College, Dublin, and obtained a Master of Arts in Management for Pastoral and Voluntary Services from Dublin City University in 2006.

He was also appointed chairperson of the diocesan council of priests in 2005, and later as vicar forane for the Duleek deanery in September 2006.

Episcopal ministry

Bishop of Kildare and Leighlin 
Nulty was appointed Bishop-elect of Kildare and Leighlin by Pope Francis on 7 May 2013, becoming the youngest bishop in Ireland by succeeding the Archbishop of Armagh, Eamon Martin, by two years. He was consecrated by the Archbishop of Dublin, Diarmuid Martin, on 4 August in the Cathedral of the Assumption, Carlow.

In light of the Government decision to hold a referendum on same-sex marriage in 2015, Nulty emphasised in November 2013 said while there is always a need to treat homosexuals with compassion, he added that the very nature of marriage and children and their importance to society are worth protecting, saying that "[the] Catholic Church will continue to hold that the differences between a man and woman are not accidental to marriage but fundamental to it and that children have a natural right to a mother and a father and that this is the best environment for them where possible".

Ahead of a referendum on easing divorce restrictions in May 2019, he issued a statement suggesting that "the objective of the proposed referendum is not to support marriage, rather to liberalise divorce", and that "it is imperative that we continue to work together to promote marriage and family.”

Apostolic Administrator of Ossory 
Following the installation of Dermot Farrell as Archbishop of Dublin on 2 February 2021, Nulty was announced as Apostolic Administrator of Ossory. He served in this role until the consecration of Niall Coll as Bishop of Ossory on 22 January 2023.

Following the easing of restrictions brought about by the COVID-19 pandemic, Nulty announced on 4 July that for the first time in living memory, a confirmation ceremony would take place in the open-air surroundings of a GAA stadium, with 392 primary school children from four parishes in Kilkenny city receiving the sacrament on 9 September in Nowlan Park, Kilkenny. A similar ceremony took place for 361 primary school children from seven schools in Portlaoise on 18 September in O'Moore Park, Portlaoise.

References

External links 

 Bishop Denis Nulty on Catholic-Hierarchy.org
 Bishop Denis Nulty on GCatholic
 Bishop Denis Nulty on Twitter

1963 births
People from County Meath
Alumni of St Patrick's College, Maynooth
Alumni of All Hallows College, Dublin
21st-century Roman Catholic bishops in Ireland
Roman Catholic bishops of Kildare and Leighlin
Living people